For Love or Money is a Filipino drama series to be broadcast by TV5 starring Alice Dixson Derek Ramsay, Ritz Azul Alice Dixson. It premiered on October 17, 2013 every Thursday nights and ended on January 16, 2014 on the network's primetime block.

Overview
Roselle and Edward are a young ambitious couple struggling to achieve their dreams, until they cross paths with the wealthy and beautiful Kristine, who offers Roselle 10 million pesos for 10 days with Edward.

Cast

Main cast
Alice Dixson as Kristine Almonte - Kristine inherited her family's shipping empire. Having grown up wealthy, she feels she could achieve anything she wants with the right price. Yet all these outward signs of success can't hide the fact that Kristine is lonely—until she meets Edward, to whom she makes an irresistible offer of 10 million pesos for 10 days with him for reasons only she knows.
Derek Ramsay as Edward Villanueva - Edward owns a small production house that covers events, but the money he earns is just enough to provide for him and his ambitious wife Roselle. When Kristine offers him 10 million pesos in exchange for 10 days with him, Edward and Roselle consider the rewards and consequences of choosing the life-changing money over their love for each other.
Ritz Azul as Roselle Villanueva - Smart, beautiful but lacking in confidence, Roselle is a regular office worker who dreams of a better life. She loves her husband Edward deeply, but can't give him the one thing that would complete them: a baby. As she's constantly worrying about becoming rich, she feels that they are not yet ready for that kind of responsibility. Suddenly faced with Kristine's tempting offer, will Roselle lend her husband  to achieve the life that she's always yearned for?

Supporting cast
Edward Mendez as Benj - Benj is Edward's best friend.
Ricci Chan as Ambet - Ambet is Kristine's confidante.
Via Antonio as Joy - Joy is Roselle's best friend.

See also
List of programs broadcast by The 5 Network

References

External links
TV5 Philippines Official website

Philippine drama television series
2013 Philippine television series debuts
2014 Philippine television series endings
TV5 (Philippine TV network) original programming
Filipino-language television shows